The women's half marathon event at the 1999 Summer Universiade was held on 11 July in Palma de Mallorca, Spain.

Results

References

Athletics at the 1999 Summer Universiade
1999 in women's athletics
1999